Kenza Dali (born 31 July 1991) is a French professional footballer who plays as a midfielder for Women's Super League club Aston Villa and the France national team.

Club career
Before joining Lyon, Dali played for Paris Saint-Germain, who she joined following the 2010–11 season after a successful season with Rodez AF. Prior to playing for Rodez, Dali spent five years with Lyon. She spent the majority of her career with Lyon playing on the club's reserve team in D3 Féminine, the third level of women's football in France.

West Ham United
On 21 May 2021, Dali was released by West Ham United.

International career
Dali was called up to the France national team for the first time in her career in 2014. She played her first game in a 2015 FIFA Women's World Cup qualification match against Hungary, being substituted into the game in the 76th minute. She scored her first goal for the senior national team in a friendly match against Brazil.

Personal life
Dali is of Algerian descent.

Career statistics

Club

International

Scores and results list France's goal tally first, score column indicates score after each Dali goal.

References

External links

 PSG player profile
 
 
 Player stats  at footofeminin.fr

1991 births
Living people
French women's footballers
France women's youth international footballers
France women's international footballers
Paris Saint-Germain Féminine players
Olympique Lyonnais Féminin players
Sportspeople from Rhône (department)
Women's association football midfielders
French sportspeople of Algerian descent
2015 FIFA Women's World Cup players
Rodez AF (women) players
Division 1 Féminine players
West Ham United F.C. Women players
Women's Super League players
French expatriate women's footballers
Dijon FCO (women) players
Expatriate women's footballers in England
Lille OSC (women) players
Footballers from Auvergne-Rhône-Alpes
UEFA Women's Euro 2022 players
French expatriate sportspeople in England

Aston Villa W.F.C. players
Everton F.C. (women) players